Lake Snudy  is a freshwater lake in the Braslaw District of Vitebsk Region, northern Belarus, the second largest in the group of Braslaw Lakes and 9th largest in Belarus.

References

Snudy
Braslaw District